Sheykhvanlu-ye Sofla (also Romanized as Sheykhvānlū-ye Soflá; also known as Sheykhvānlū-ye Pa’īn) is a village in Shahrestaneh Rural District, Now Khandan District, Dargaz County, Razavi Khorasan Province, Iran. At the 2006 census, its population was 226, in 65 families.

References 

Populated places in Dargaz County